Madera is an unincorporated community in Clearfield County, Pennsylvania, United States. Madera has a post office with ZIP code 16661, which opened on January 31, 1861.

References

Unincorporated communities in Clearfield County, Pennsylvania
Unincorporated communities in Pennsylvania